Strangers' Meeting is a 1957 crime drama film directed by Robert Day and starring Peter Arne and Delphi Lawrence.

Premise
Trapeze artist Harry is wrongly convicted of murder after his partner falls to her death. He escapes from jail and hides out in a country pub, on a mission to uncover the identity of the real killer.

Cast
Peter Arne as Harry Belair
Delphi Lawrence as Margot Sanders
Conrad Phillips as David Sanders
Barbara Archer as Rosie Foster
Victor Maddern as Willie Fisher
David Ritch as Giovanni  
Doris Hare as Nellie  
John Kelly as Michael OHara  
David Lodge as Fred  
Norman Rossington as Barrow Boy

References

External links

1957 films
Films directed by Robert Day
British crime drama films
1957 crime drama films
1950s English-language films
1950s British films